Morgan City High School is a public secondary school located in Morgan City, Louisiana, United States. It is operated by the St. Mary Parish School Board.

The school colors are green and white. The school opened in 1911 and celebrated its centennial year in 2011. MCHS was rated as a Bronze Medal School in the 2015 U.S. News & World Report "Best High Schools" rankings.

Athletics
Morgan City High athletics competes in the LHSAA.

Championships
Football championships
(4) State Championships: 1913, 1922, 1923, 1957 

Baseball championship
(1) State Championships: 1973 

Cross country championship
(1) State Championships: 1974 

Softball championships
(1) State Championship: 1984

Notable alumni
 Eddie Dyer (1899-1964), baseball player and manager
 Urban Henry (1935-1979), football player
 Shawn Long, basketball player
 Merlin O'Neill, US Coast Guard Admiral and tenth Commandant of the Coast Guard
 M. David Stirling, lawyer and politician
 Vernon Norwood, track and field athlete

References

External links
 Morgan City High School website
 Accreditation

Public high schools in Louisiana
Schools in St. Mary Parish, Louisiana
Morgan City, Louisiana
Educational institutions established in 1911
1911 establishments in Louisiana